Sijikumar Sadandan (born 23 May 1974) is an Indian canoeing athlete who had won the bronze medal in men's C-2 1000M in 1994 Asian Games.

References

Living people
Indian male canoeists
Asian Games medalists in canoeing
Canoeists at the 1994 Asian Games
Medalists at the 1994 Asian Games
Asian Games bronze medalists for India
Malayali people
1974 births